The Delta County Library system consists of five libraries serving its rural towns in Colorado: Delta, Hotchkiss, Cedaredge, Paonia, and Crawford. The Delta County Library district provides the county's 30,334 total population  with shelves of hardbacks, paperbacks, large print books, audio/visual materials, downloadable materials, magazines, newspapers, databases, and items representing local history. Each library also provides public access to computers, iPads, printers, copiers, and other equipment. All library branches hold scheduled programs for all age groups; preschoolers, young children, teenagers, adults, seniors, and the Delta Libraries offer family classes. GED and ESL courses are offered through the library but are provided throughout the county in multiple locations 

The Library District is overseen by the Library Board with representatives from each of the library branch communities as well as other representatives that are “at large”.

 District Director: LaDonna Gunn
 Collections Coordinator: Leah Morris
 PR & Marketing Manager: Tracy Ihnot
 Program and Outreach Manager, Literacy, GED, ESL: Gail Srebnik
 North Fork Regional Library Manager: Sarah Smith
 West End Regional Library Manager: Adriana Chavira

History 
The Delta library (1911) building is associated with the nationwide Carnegie public library movement. Through the Carnegie Foundation contributing $6500 towards construction, and efforts of the local Woman's club who raised $3400, the Delta Library was dedicated in 1912. Architect G.R. Felmlee designed the original building out of yellow brick with sandstone trim. An addition by Dona, Larson, Roubal & Assoc. was designed for the building in 1984.

The current Cedaredge Library building opened in 1997, the Hotchkiss Library in 2002, the Delta Library received a large addition in 2005, the Crawford Library was constructed in 2008, and the Paonia Library in 2009.

Locations 
Cedaredge Branch - 180 SW 6th Ave.
Cedaredge, CO 81413

Crawford Branch - 545 Hwy. 92
Crawford, CO 81415

Hotchkiss Branch - 149 E. Main 
Hotchkiss, CO 81419

Delta Branch - 211 W. 6th Street
Delta, CO 81416

Paonia Branch - 2 3rd Street
Paonia, CO 81428

References

Delta Public Library — Southwest Colorado Heritage. (n.d.). Retrieved from http://www.swcoloradoheritage.com/heritage-attractions/delta-public-library/index.html@show_more=1

About Us. Delta County Libraries. Retrieved from http://www.deltalibraries.org/about/

Berry, J. I. (2002). Dawn in Delta County. (2002 LJ Series A Day in the Life: rural libraries). Library Journal, (4). 52.

Delta County, Colorado
Carnegie libraries in Colorado
Libraries established in 1911